Asura metahyala is a moth of the family Erebidae. It is found on the Philippines.

References

metahyala
Moths described in 1918
Moths of Asia